1995 Bellmare Hiratsuka season

Review and events

League results summary

League results by round

Competitions

Domestic results

J.League

Emperor's Cup

Super Cup

International results

Asian Cup Winners' Cup

Player statistics

 † player(s) joined the team after the opening of this season.

Transfers

In:

Out:

Transfers during the season

In
 José Alves dos Santos Júnior (on September)
 Émerson Luiz Firmino (on September)

Out
 Almir (on September)
 Hiroaki Matsuyama (to Tosu Futures)

Awards
none

References

Other pages
 J. League official site
 Shonan Bellmare official website

Bellmare Hiratsuka
Shonan Bellmare seasons